The president of the Senate of Chile is the presiding officer of the Senate of Chile. The position comes after the Ministers of State in the line of succession of the President of Chile in case of temporary incapacitation or vacancy, according to Article 29 of the Constitution of Chile.

Functions 

The President of the Senate receives no special treatment in the sessions of Senate.

Presidents of the Senate of Chile

See also
 National Congress of Chile

References

Sources
  
  

Government of Chile
Chile, Senate